Loo village is a village in Jõelähtme Parish, Harju County in northern Estonia.

References

 

Villages in Harju County